WYKM is a Country formatted broadcast radio station licensed to Rupert, West Virginia, serving Rupert, Rainelle, and the northwest corner of Greenbrier County, West Virginia. WYKM is owned and operated by Mountain State Broadcasting Company.

External links

YKM
YKM
Radio stations established in 1981
1981 establishments in West Virginia